Riccardo Bolzan (born 1 September 1984) is an Italian professional footballer who plays as a defender for Eccellenza Campania team F.C. Sorrento.

Club career

Serie D
Born in Gaiarine, the Province of Treviso, Veneto, Bolzan started his senior career with local side of Cordignano. in the next season he left for Bellunoponte, another Serie D side. After a limited chance, he left for his third Serie D side Conegliano San Vendemiano.

Lega Pro
In July 2003, he left for Venezia along with Fabio Mazzeo, located in the regional capital, Venice. He was loaned to Serie C2 side Sangiovannese and turned to co–ownership deal a season later, after the team won promotion playoff.

In June 2005, Sangiovannese signed the remain rights by made a higher tender price between the two clubs; Venezia went bankrupt few weeks later. Bolzan played the opening league match with the Tuscany based team against Pisa on 28 August, But on 30 August 2005 returned to Veneto for Serie A side Chievo.

On the same day, he left for Serie B side Modena. The Serie B side also signed Cristian Bucchi and Tommaso Chiecchi from Chievo in co-ownership deals few weeks before. In his first Serie B season, he made nil appearance with the Emilia–Romagna side. In June 2006, Modena decided not to buy Bolzan and Chievo decided not to buy Giuseppe Gemiti; however, Modena signed Bucchi and Chievo bought back  Chiecchi.

In 2006–07 season, he left for Serie C1 club Pisa, which he won the promotion playoffs. In 2007-08 season, he remained in Tuscany for another Serie C1 club Lucchese.

In 2008-09 season, he remained in Lega Pro Prima Divisione (ex–Serie C1), but now for Lombardy side Monza. He made a break through that season, made 31 league appearances. In 2009–10 season, he was sold to southern Italy (Apulia) for Prima Divisione side Taranto in co–ownership deal, along with Roberto Cortese.

In June 2010, both clubs failed to agree a price for the players and the ownership was decided by the tender price the clubs submitted to Lega Calcio. On 26 June 2010, Lega Calcio announced that Taranto made a higher bid to buy Bolzan from Chievo and Chievo made a higher bid to sign Cortese.

In July 2010, he was sold to Prima Divisione side Nocerina.

In 2016, he signed for Eccellenza Campania side F.C. Sorrento, newly refounded after their administration and temporary expulsion from league football.

International career
Bolzan received a call-up from Italy U21 B team specially for 2005 Mediterranean Games, and for a preparation match against Serie D Best XI. He was at the bench in the 2 group stage matches. He also received a call-up from Italy under-21 Serie B representative team in November 2005, for a training camp and against Pro Patria's youth team (Berretti team).

References

External links
 
 Football.it Profile 

Living people
1984 births
Sportspeople from the Province of Treviso
Italian footballers
Footballers from Veneto
Association football defenders
A.C. Belluno 1905 players
Modena F.C. players
Pisa S.C. players
S.S.D. Lucchese 1905 players
A.C. Monza players
Taranto F.C. 1927 players
A.S.D. Sangiovannese 1927 players
Competitors at the 2005 Mediterranean Games
Mediterranean Games competitors for Italy